Hogg is a Scottish, English or Irish surname.

Authors and journalism
 James Hogg (1770–1835), Scottish poet and novelist
 Thomas Jefferson Hogg (1792–1862), English biographer
 Ian V. Hogg (1926–2002), British military author
 Min Hogg (1939–2019), English journalist and magazine editor

Entertainment
 Viola Wilson Hogg known as Viola Wilson (1911–2002), Scottish soprano
 Ian Hogg (actor) (born 1937), English actor
 Michael Lindsay-Hogg (born 1940), American-born television and stage director
 Joanna Hogg, (born 20 March 1960) English film director and screenwriter
 BJ Hogg (1955–2020) Northern Irish actor and writer
 Joanne Hogg, Irish singer and songwriter

Politics and government
 Samuel E. Hogg (1783–1842), American congressman
 Sir James Hogg, 1st Baronet (1790–1876) Irish-born businessman, lawyer and politician
 James McGarel-Hogg, 1st Baron Magheramorne (1823–1890), British politician born in India
 Stuart Saunders Hogg (1833–1921), Indian-born British civil servant
 Alexander Hogg (1841–1920), New Zealand politician
 Jim Hogg (1851–1906), governor of Texas
 Charles E. Hogg (1852–1935), West Virginia congressman
 James McGarel-Hogg, 2nd Baron Magheramorne (1861–1903), Anglo-Irish Peer
 Dudley McGarel-Hogg, 3rd Baron Magheramorne (1863–1946), Anglo-Irish peer
 Douglas Hogg, 1st Viscount Hailsham (1872–1950), English barrister and Conservative Party politician
 Norman Hogg (Labour politician) (1907–1975), Scottish Labour Councillor and Lord Provost of Aberdeen
 Quintin Hogg, Baron Hailsham of St Marylebone (1907–2001), English barrister and Conservative Party politician
 Norman Hogg, Baron Hogg of Cumbernauld (born 1938), Scottish Labour Party politician
 Caroline Hogg (born 1942), Australian Labor Party politician
 Bob Hogg (born ?, ex-husband of Caroline Hogg), Australian Labor Party politician
 Douglas Hogg, 3rd Viscount Hailsham (born 1945), English barrister and Conservative Party politician
 Sarah Hogg, Baroness Hogg (born 1946), English journalist, economist and Conservative/Crossbench politician
 Ron Hogg CBE (1951-2019) - Police and Crime Commissioner of Durham and Labour Party politician 
 John Hogg (born 1949), Australian Labor Party politician
 Rob Hogg (born 1967), Iowa State Senator 
 David Hogg (born 2000), American gun control advocate
 Lauren Hogg (born 2003), American gun control advocate

Scholars and scientists
 Robert Hogg (biologist) (1818–1897), Scottish botanist
 Arthur Robert Hogg (1903–1966), Australian physicist and astronomer
 Frank Scott Hogg (1904–1951), Canadian astronomer
 Helen Sawyer Hogg (1905–1993), Canadian astronomer
 J. Bernard Hogg (1908–1994), American labour historian
 Robert V. Hogg (1924–2014), American professor of statistics (University of Iowa)
 Peter Hogg (1939–2020), Canadian constitutional scholar
 Richard M. Hogg (1944–2007), Scottish linguist
 Michael Hogg (born 1954), Indian-born British professor of social psychology specialising in social identity theory

Sports
 George Hogg (footballer) (born 1869), Scottish footballer with Heart of Midlothian
 Robert Hogg (footballer) (1877–1963), English footballer with Sunderland and Blackpool
 Billy Hogg (1879–1937), English footballer with Sunderland, Glasgow Rangers, Dundee, and Raith Rovers
 Jack Hogg (1881–1944), English footballer with Southampton
 Bobby Hogg (footballer, born 1914) (1914–1975), Scottish footballer and manager (Celtic, West Bromwich Albion, Cardiff City)
 Sonja Hogg (born 1945), American basketball coach
 Rodney Hogg (born 1951), Australian cricketer
 Vincent Hogg (born 1952), Zimbabwean cricketer
 Graeme Hogg (born 1964), Scottish footballer (Manchester United, Portsmouth, Heart of Midlothian)
 Jeff Hogg (born 1966), Australian rules footballer
 Brad Hogg (born 1971), Australian cricketer
 Allister Hogg (born 1983), Scottish rugby union player
 Kyle Hogg (born 1983), English cricketer
 Steven Hogg (born 1985), English midfield footballer (Shrewsbury Town, Gretna, York City, Salford City)
 Chris Hogg (born 1985), English footballer (Ipswich Town, Hibernian, Inverness Caledonian Thistle, Needham Market)
 Jonathan Hogg (born 1988), English footballer (Aston Villa, Watford, Huddersfield Town)
 Stuart Hogg (born 1992), Scottish rugby union player
 Jessica Hogg (born 1995), Welsh artistic gymnast
 Russell Hogg (1968–2012), Scottish badminton player

Others
 Caroline Hogg, Scottish victim of serial killer Robert Black
 Sir Christopher Hogg (1936–2021), British business executive
 David R. Hogg (born 1958), United States Army officer
 George Hogg (adventurer) (1914–1945), British adventurer in China
 Henry Roughton Hogg (1846–1923), English amateur arachnologist
 Ian Hogg (Royal Navy officer) (1911–2003), British Navy officer
 Ima Hogg (1882–1975), American philanthropist
 John Hogg (martyr) (died 1590), English Catholic priest and martyr
 Joseph L. Hogg, officer in the Confederate States Army
 Margaret Hogg (died 1976), British murder victim
 Mary Hogg (born 1947), English High Court judge
 Pam Hogg, Scottish fashion designer
 Quintin Hogg (merchant) (1845–1903), English philanthropist

See also
Ogg (surname)

External links
 The Hogg Surname Centre

English-language surnames
Hogg family